The 2018 J.League Cup Final was an association football match between Shonan Bellmare and Yokohama F. Marinos on 27 October 2018 at Saitama Stadium 2002. It was the 26th edition J.League Cup, organised by the J.League. Shonan Bellmare won the championship. The winners earned the right to play against the winners of the 2018 Copa Sudamericana in the 2019 J.League Cup / Copa Sudamericana Championship.

Match details

See also
2018 J.League Cup

References

J.League Cup
2018 in Japanese football
Shonan Bellmare matches
Yokohama F. Marinos matches